Cretornis is a pterosaur genus from the late Cretaceous period (Turonian stage) of what is now the Jizera Formation in the Czech Republic, dating to about 92 million years ago. It only contains a single species, Cretornis hlavaci.

Discovery and naming
The fossils were discovered in 1880 by workers at a quarry in Zářecká Lhota near the town of Choceň, who were getting gravel to repair a local road. A certain Mrs. Tomková, a croupier from Choceň, then alerted František Hlaváč, a Choceň pharmacist and fossil collector, to the find. He recognised exceptionality of that one, secured the rest of the fossils and then sent them to naturalist Professor Antonín Frič in Prague. In 1881, Antonín Frič identified it as a pterosaur and named it as the type species Cretornis Hlaváči. The generic name is derived from Latin creta, "chalk", in reference to the Cretaceous, and Greek ὄρνις, ornis, "bird", as Frič originally thought that the fossil bones belonged to some kind of ancient toothed bird (similar to the genus Ichthyornis). The specific name honors Hlaváč. 

Today, the holotype of this pterosaur are stored in the National Museum in Prague. There is also unconfirmed information that similar bones (perhaps also pterosaur bones) were found in other places around the quarry before this discovery, but later they were apparently lost. 

Afterwards it was realized that the find represented some pterosaur. The name was incorrectly emended by Richard Lydekker into Ornithochirus hlavatschi Fritsch 1881, in 1888. As scientific species names are not allowed to contain diacritical signs, the specific name had to be transcribed. Lydekker chose to write it as if it, and Frič himself, were German, as Bohemia at the time was under a strong German cultural influence. Frič, an ethnic Czech, in 1905 ultimately used the correct transcription Ornithocheirus hlavaci.

Since 1905, the taxon was typically considered a nomen dubium. In 2010 however, Alexandr Averianov concluded that it should be possible to determine unique traits. In 2015 he published a new description, concluding that Cretornis was a valid taxon.

Cretornis is known from the holotype, presently preserved in the collection of the Národní muzeum (National Museum) in Prague as "Object 10". It was found in what Frič called the Mittlere Iserschichten, today known as the Jizera Formation, dating from the Turonian. It is a partial skeleton lacking the skull. It contains a complete humerus (upper arm bone), an ulna, radius, wrist and two phalanges of the wing finger.

Description

In 2015, Averianov indicated a single autapomorphy, unique derived trait: the distal part of the humerus has a diamond-shaped cross-section.

Classification
Cretornis was classified as a species in the genus Ornithocheirus in the nineteenth century. In 1997 Coralia-Maria Jianu suggested it belonged to the Pteranodontidae. In 2010, Averianov thought is it was a member of the Azhdarchidae. More detailed comparisons of the wing bones led Averianov to conclude in 2015 that they belonged to a non-azhdarchid azhdarchoid, probably a member of the group Neoazhdarchia with which it has many features in common. It is probably more advanced than the Thalassodromidae, and shares with Montanazhdarcho the trait that the distal part of the ulna has a joint surface that is placed more proximal than the tubercle. In 2018, paleontologist Nicholas Longrich and colleagues had recovered Cretornis within the family Nyctosauridae, in a more derived position than Alamodactylus and Volgadraco, this contradicts its position within the Azhdarchoidea. The cladogram of their analysis is shown below:

See also
 List of pterosaur genera
 Timeline of pterosaur research

References

Late Cretaceous pterosaurs of Europe
Ornithocheiroids
Fossil taxa described in 1881